The United States House Select Committee on Strategic Competition between the United States and the Chinese Communist Party is a committee of the United States House of Representatives established in the 118th Congress. The committee focuses on economic and security competition with the Chinese Communist Party (CCP). The committee is chaired by Representative Mike Gallagher of Wisconsin.

History 
Republicans in Congress initially attempted to introduce a proposal for a committee dedicated to China near the end of the 116th Congress, though the effort was abandoned when negotiations between the Republican minority and then-Speaker Nancy Pelosi faltered. Instead a Republican-led China Task Force emerged under Foreign Affairs Committee ranking member Michael McCaul which though partisan in nature, introduced hundreds of policy proposals with often robust bipartisan support. It also helped advance aid to Taiwan, working with the country's de facto embassy in Washington to advance the flow of American military assistance. The committee produced a wide-ranging and partly classified report in September 2020.

In October 2022, Mike Gallagher told reporters that an independent China committee would "go a long way towards coordinating policy across the many committee jurisdictions and thereby create a more coherent approach to our China policy" 

On December 8, 2022, Kevin McCarthy, the Republican nominee for the Speaker of the House, wrote in an op-ed that the United States is locked in a new Cold War with China, and unveiled the committee among a slate of efforts to confront, counter, and respond to the Chinese government, writing:"To win the new Cold War, we must respond to Chinese aggression with tough policies to strengthen our economy, rebuild our supply chains, speak out for human rights, stand against military aggression, and end the theft of Americans’ personal information, intellectual property, and jobs. We must recognize that China’s "peaceful rise" was pure fiction and finally to confront and respond to the Chinese Communist Party with the urgency the threat demands. To do that, House Republicans will establish a Select Committee on China in the new Congress."In his response to his appointment as committee chair, Gallagher said:"The greatest threat to the United States is the Chinese Communist Party. The CCP continues to commit genocide, obscure the origins of the coronavirus pandemic, steal hundreds of billions of dollars worth of American intellectual property, and threaten Taiwan. The Select Committee on China will push back in bipartisan fashion before its too late."In an op-ed to FoxNews.com, the two described the committee as the starting point for a holistic government approach that will build on the efforts of the previous Republican-led China Task Force and "ensure America is prepared to tackle the economic and security challenges posed by the CCP."

Scope 
The select committee is likely to focus not only on international affairs but also topics of concern regarding the influence of the Chinese Communist Party within the United States. The Hill reported that the committee was likely to take interest in large purchases of American agricultural lands by Chinese firms, China's human rights issues, and "ideological warfare."

Members, 118th Congress

See also 

 United States-China Economic and Security Review Commission
 Congressional-Executive Commission on China
 Cox Report

References

External links 
 Select Committee on the Strategic Competition Between the United States and the Chinese Communist Party on Congress.gov
 Hearings and meetings video on Congress.gov

118th United States Congress
2023 establishments in the United States
China–United States relations
Select Committees of the United States Congress